This is a list of Members of Parliament (MPs) elected to the House of Commons by constituencies in England for the Fifty-Fourth Parliament of the United Kingdom (2005 to 2010).

It includes both MPs elected at the 2005 general election, held on 5 May 2005, and those subsequently elected in by-elections.

The list is sorted by the name of the MP, and MPs who did not serve throughout the Parliament are italicised. New MPs elected since the general election are noted at the bottom of the page.

Full composition before 2010 election

 MPs in the East of England region 

 MPs in the East Midlands region 

 MPs in the London region 

 MPs in the North East region 

 MPs in the North West region 

 MPs in the South East region 

 MPs in the South West region 

 MPs in the West Midlands region 

 MPs in the Yorkshire and Humber region 

 Total MPs 

 By-elections 

See also
 Results of the 2005 United Kingdom general election
 List of MPs elected in the 2005 United Kingdom general election
 List of MPs for constituencies in Scotland (2005–2010)
 List of MPs for constituencies in Northern Ireland (2005–2010)
 List of MPs for constituencies in Wales (2005–2010)
 List of United Kingdom Labour MPs (2005–2010)
 List of United Kingdom Labour and Labour Co-operative MPs (2005–2010)
 List of United Kingdom Labour Co-operative MPs (2005–2010)
 List of United Kingdom Conservative MPs (2005–2010)
 List of United Kingdom Liberal Democrat MPs (2005–2010)
 Members of the House of Lords
 :Category:UK MPs 2005-2010

 England
2005
MPs